Wabash, St. Louis & Pacific Railway Company v. Illinois, 118 U.S. 557 (1886), also known as the Wabash Case, was a Supreme Court decision that severely limited the rights of states to control or impede interstate commerce. It led to the creation of the Interstate Commerce Commission.

The court
The majority's opinion was written by Justice Samuel Miller; joining him were associate justices Stephen Field, John Harlan, William Woods, Stanley Matthews, and Samuel Blatchford. Dissenting were Chief Justice Morrison Waite and associate justices Joseph Bradley and Horace Gray.

The case
The case was argued on April 14, 1886 - April 15, 1886 and was decided on October 25, 1886 by vote of 6 to 3. Associate Justice Miller wrote for the Court with Associate Justices Field, Harlan, Woods, Matthews, and Blatchford concurring; Associate Justices Bradley and Gray, along with Chief Justice Waite, dissented.

In Wabash, "direct" burdens on interstate commerce were not permitted by the Export Tax Clause of the Constitution (Article I, Section 9); however, those "indirect" burdens were permitted under the Commerce Clause. This was a standard enacted in Cooley v. Board of Wardens (1852).

Effects of decision
The Wabash decision led to the creation in 1887 of the first modern regulatory agency, the Interstate Commerce Commission.
It clarified the "direct" v. "indirect" test (though this doctrine was abandoned in the 1930s).
It was one of the first instances in government assuming responsibility for economic affairs that had previously been delegated to the states.

See also
Munn v. Illinois
List of United States Supreme Court cases, volume 118

References

External links

Supreme Court cases citing Wabash

Railway litigation in 1886
United States Constitution Article One case law
United States Supreme Court cases
United States Dormant Commerce Clause case law
1886 in United States case law
Wabash Railroad
Interstate Commerce Commission litigation
Legal history of Illinois
United States Supreme Court cases of the Waite Court